Ensino Lugo Club de Baloncesto, also known for sponsorship reasons as Durán Maquinaria Ensino is a Spanish women's basketball team, currently competing in the Spanish First Division.

History
Founded in 1980 as CD Ensino, the club debuted in the third tier of the Spanish league system, called 2ª División Nacional, with most players coming from the Compañía de María school in Lugo. In its seventh season, the club finished 3rd and promoted to the second tier league, called the 1ª División B. The club played in this division for seven of the next eight seasons, with a relegation to the third tier and an immediate promotion, until 1995, when they were promoted for the first time to the first tier league, called Primera División, with Manel Sánchez as coach.

The club played for 12 consecutive seasons in the Spanish top tier league, since its promotion in 1995 to its relegation in 2007, finishing third in three seasons (1999, 2000, 2004). Its best regular season was in 1998-99, when they finished first. In addition it reached the final of the national Cup twice (1999, 2002), with Juan Corral as coach.

After eleven seasons and five failed promotion playoffs, Ensino came back to Liga Femenina in 2018. It achieved a streak of 19 consecutive wins, including the four games of the promotion playoffs, in the third season of Juan Nécega as head coach.

Sponsorship naming
 CD Ensino (1980-1993)
 Fonxesta Ensino (1994–1997)
 Ensino Universidade (1998–1999)
 Ensino Yaya María (1999–2001)
 Yaya María Breogán (2001–2005)
 Yaya María Porta XI (2005–2006)
 Durán Maquinaria Ensino (2007–present)

Current roster
Roster for the 2021-22 Liga Femenina.

Season by season

Xuncas Baloncesto
Porta XI Ensino CBF is not to be confused with an older women's basketball club from Lugo, Xuncas Baloncesto, which played in the first tier league from 1986-87 to 1991-92, when it was dissolved. In its short spell in the Liga Femenina, Xuncas was league runner-up twice (1987 and 1989) and Cup runner-up three times (1987, 1988 and 1989). For sponsorship reasons, the club was known as:

 Arjeriz Xuncas (until 1988)
 Pizarras Inlusa Xuncas (1988-1989)
 Magefesa Xuncas (1989–1992)

References

External links
Official website

Women's basketball teams in Spain
Basketball teams established in 1980
Sport in Lugo
Basketball teams in Galicia (Spain)